Mystic Cottage is a historic U.S. home located at 105 Magnolia Road, Pinehurst, North Carolina.  It was the first home of the Leonard Tufts family in Pinehurst.  Tufts took over from father James Walker Tufts and was followed by son Richard Tufts, in running the Pinehurst Resort.

The cottage was described in 1900 as elaborate, with 14 rooms and all the modern improvements.  The three-story building has a wrap around porch.  The porch was extended to the second story later. It is now used for commercial purposes.  The cottage is part of the Pinehurst Historic District, added to the National Register of Historic Places in 1973.  The district became a National Historic Landmark District in 1996.

References

External links

A Guide to the Historic Village of Pinehurst -Tufts Archives

Houses completed in 1899
Houses on the National Register of Historic Places in North Carolina
Houses in Moore County, North Carolina
National Register of Historic Places in Moore County, North Carolina
Historic district contributing properties in North Carolina
Tufts family